Pissed Jeans is an American hardcore punk band from Allentown, Pennsylvania. The band claims to play "loud, heavy, noisy, punk rock" and is influenced by 1980s hardcore punk and post-hardcore bands. The band has released several seven singles and five albums, and are currently signed to the record label Sub Pop in Seattle.

History
The members of Pissed Jeans all attended Nazareth Area High School in Nazareth, Pennsylvania in the Lehigh Valley region of eastern Pennsylvania. The band initially planned to use the name Unrequited Hard-On before ultimately settling on Pissed Jeans. As Matt Korvette explains,

Pissed Jeans released its debut, Shallow, in 2005 on Parts Unknown Records.  This was followed by Hope for Men (2007), King of Jeans (2009) and Honeys (2013), all released on Sub Pop Records.

The New York Times wrote that the band was "bring(ing) back '80s memories of hard, slovenly noise, when punk bands realized they could slow down and let their music fall apart a bit"; however, the article also observed the "aggressive, nasty" reaction of attendees at a 2008 show, who evidently were unprepared for Pissed Jeans sonics. The concert goers "started to huddle defensively on the sides," with "the columns of speakers on either side of the band...being used as something to hold on to. Average hipsters started to look like sailors clinging to a mast in a storm," The New York Times reported.

Their album Honeys was released in February 2013. AllMusic noted that "Fortunately, when the world has you feeling trapped, Pissed Jeans are there to help you rage out for a bit while you find some perspective."

In March 2013, Pissed Jeans was named one of Fuse TV's 30 must-see artists at SXSW.

Pissed Jeans' latest album Why Love Now was released in February 2017.

Discography

LPs
Shallow (Parts Unknown, 2005)
Hope For Men (Sub Pop, 2007)
King of Jeans (Sub Pop, 2009)
Honeys (Sub Pop, 2013)
Why Love Now (Sub Pop, 2017)

EPs
Throbbing Organ/Night Minutes (Parts Unknown, 2004)
Don't Need Smoke to Make Myself Disappear/Love Clown (Sub Pop, 2006)
Sam Kinison Woman/The L Word (Sub Pop, 2010)

References

External links
 Band website
 Pissed Jeans on Sub Pop

Punk rock groups from Pennsylvania
Musicians from Allentown, Pennsylvania
Sub Pop artists